Raúl Villagómez (born 8 March 1950) is a Mexican former swimmer. He competed in two events at the 1968 Summer Olympics.

References

External links
 

1950 births
Living people
Mexican male swimmers
Olympic swimmers of Mexico
Swimmers at the 1968 Summer Olympics
Swimmers from Mexico City